Solnechny (masculine), Solnechnaya (feminine), or Solnechnoye (neuter) may refer to:
Solnechny District, a district of Khabarovsk Krai, Russia
Solnechny Urban Okrug, several municipal urban okrugs in Russia
Solnechny Urban Settlement, several municipal urban settlements in Russia
Solnechny (inhabited locality) (Solnechnaya, Solnechnoye), several inhabited localities in Russia
Solnechny Bay, Bolshevik Island, Severnaya Zemlya

See also
Soniachna Dolyna (or Solnechnaya Dolina), a village in Crimea